Micropolygyria is a neuronal migration disorder, a developmental anomaly of the brain characterized by development of numerous small convolutions (microgyri), causing intellectual disability and/or other neurological disorders. It is present in a number of specific neurological diseases, notably multiple sclerosis and :Fukuyama congenital muscular dystrophy, a specific disease cause by mutation in the :Fukutin gene (FKTN).

References

External links 

Brain disorders